Jason Godin (born January 21, 1993) is a former mayor of Maisonnette, New Brunswick in Canada. At 19 years old, he was elected to the municipal election May 14, 2012, and took office May 28, 2012 as the youngest mayor in the history of New Brunswick.  Godin decided to run for mayor when he learned that the incumbent, Lucio Cordisco, would not stand for reelection if there were other candidates. On February 12, 2015, he announced that he would seek the federal New Democratic Party nomination in the riding of Acadie—Bathurst for the 2015 federal election. He won the nomination, but was defeated by Liberal Serge Cormier in the general election. Godin did not seek re-election in the 2016 municipal election.

Prior to the election, he was a business administration student at the University of Moncton in Shippagan.

Electoral record

References

Acadian people
Mayors of places in New Brunswick
Living people
Université de Moncton alumni
1993 births
People from Gloucester County, New Brunswick
New Democratic Party candidates for the Canadian House of Commons
New Brunswick candidates for Member of Parliament